Piers Brendon  (born 21 December 1940) is a British historian and writer, known for historical and biographical works. He was educated at Shrewsbury School and Magdalene College, Cambridge, where he read history. He received a Ph.D. degree for his thesis, Hurrell Froude and the Oxford Movement, which was published, with much modification, in 1974.

From 1965 to 1978, he was lecturer in history, then principal lecturer and head of department, at what is now Anglia Ruskin University. Since 1979, he has worked as a freelance writer of books, journalism and for television.

In 1995, he became a fellow of Churchill College, Cambridge and was keeper of the Churchill Archives Centre from 1995 to 2001, in succession to Correlli Barnett. Brendon was himself succeeded by Allen Packwood.

Works
Hurrell Froude and the Oxford Movement (1974)
Hawker of Morwenstow - Portrait of a Victorian Eccentric (1975)
A Quest of the Sangraal, Cornish Ballads & Other Poems (1975; Robert Stephen Hawker, editor)
Eminent Edwardians (1979)
The Life and Death of the Press Barons (1983)
Winston Churchill: A Brief Life (1984)
Ike - the Life and Times of Dwight D. Eisenhower (1986)
Our Own Dear Queen (1986)
Thomas Cook - 150 Years of Popular Tourism (1991)
The Age of Reform 1820–1850 (1994)
The Motoring Century: Story of the Royal Automobile Club (1997)
The Dark Valley: A Panorama of the 1930s (2000)
The Windsors - A Dynasty Revealed 1917–2000, with Phillip Whitehead (2000: . Original 1994)

Eminent Elizabethans (2013, Penguin Books)

References

External links
The Papers of Piers Brendon held at Churchill Archives Centre

 

1940 births
Living people
Fellows of Churchill College, Cambridge
Fellows of the Royal Society of Literature
People from Stratton, Cornwall
British historians
British writers
Alumni of Magdalene College, Cambridge
People educated at Shrewsbury School
British republicans